The Gettysburg Railroad  was a short-line heritage railroad that operated in Pennsylvania from 1976 to 1996. The 23.4 mi (37.7 km) line ran from Gettysburg to Mount Holly Springs.

The railroad shipped freight for local companies and interchanged with CSX Transportation in Gettysburg and Conrail at Carlisle Junction in Mount Holly Springs. It also operated a tourist railroad under a subsidiary, Gettysburg Passenger Services.

History
The railroad was built in the late 19th century and opened in 1891 as the Gettysburg and Harrisburg Railway. The line was later leased to the Reading Railroad and operated as the "Gettysburg Branch." Following the Reading's bankruptcy in 1971, it sold portions of its assets to the new-formed Conrail in 1976, however the Gettysburg branch was not included in the transfer. The branch was acquired by the Pennsylvania Department of Transportation, which then sold the line to a new company, the Blairsville & Indiana Railroad, in 1976. The latter company subsequently changed its name to Gettysburg Railroad. The Gettysburg Railroad was sold to Delaware Valley Railroad Company, a subsidiary of RailAmerica, in 1996. Delaware Valley created a new operating company, the Gettysburg Railway.

Locomotives
The Gettysburg Railroad went through a total of four steam locomotives in use, and they only had two by 1988. Between January and June 1995, both locomotives were inspected by the Federal Railroad Administration (FRA) and deemed to be in good enough working order to remain in service.

Incident
On June 16, 1995, steam engine No. 1278 suffered a boiler backdraft explosion while hauling an excursion train, seriously injuring the engineer and both firemen, however, no passengers were injured. The excursion train was delayed 45 minutes until a diesel could be connected to complete the train's trip. The National Transportation Safety Board concluded that the explosion occurred because the crew had allowed the water level in the boiler to drop too low, causing the boiler's crown sheet to fail. The NTSB also determined that poor maintenance of the locomotive, as well as inadequate training, were contributing factors to the accident. The accident kept the railroad from running excursion trips for approximately one week, before they were resumed using engine No. 76 with diesel engine assistance.

References

Defunct Pennsylvania railroads
Railway companies established in 1976
Railway companies disestablished in 1996